ChangXin Memory Technologies (CXMT) is a Chinese semiconductor integrated device manufacturer headquartered in Hefei, Anhui specializing in the production of DRAM memory.

, ChangXin manufactures LPDDR4 and DDR4 memory on a 19 nm process, with a capacity of 40,000 wafers per month. The company planned to increase output to 120,000 wafers per month and launch 17 nm LPDDR5 by the end of 2022, with a target total capacity of 300,000 wafers per month in the long-term.

History
Together with Fujian Jinhua Integrated Circuit (JHICC) and Xi'an UniIC Semiconductors, Innotron was one of a set of Chinese semiconductor plants established in 2016 to compete with global manufacturers of computer memory. In 2017, a $7.2 billion deal for a 125,000, 12" (300mm) wafer per month production fabrication plant was announced. Innotron's factory was completed by the middle of 2017, and production equipment was installed at the plant in late 2017. Trials and mass production were scheduled for late 2018 and early 2019. In 2018, CEO Zhu Yiming was reported to have visited ASML to discuss the purchase of extreme ultraviolet lithography machines.

Initially, Innotron was thought to have chosen 8GB LPDDR4 memory as its first product. At the time, analysts claimed that patent and IP issues would present a barrier to its competing with major manufacturers. In the middle of 2018, trial production of 19 nm 8GB LPDDR4 was reported to have begun. Innotron's initial capacity was ~20,000 wafers per month; a small output in terms of the industry as a whole.

In 2019, Innotron, which had changed its name to Changxin Memory Technologies, was reported to have made some design changes in an attempt to avoid possible technology related sanctions deriving from the China–United States trade war. In December 2019, in an interview with EE Times the company stated its first fab was in productions, and producing 20,000 wafers per month, making 8GB LPDDR4 and DDR4 DRAM at 19 nm.

The company is reported to have increased production to 3% of the world DRAM output, or about 40,000 wafers a month by the end of 2020.

In 2022, the James M. Inhofe National Defense Authorization Act for Fiscal Year 2023 banned the U.S. federal government from buying or using chips from CXMT.

Facilities
As of 2019, CXMT has over 3,000 employees, and runs a fab with a 65,000 square meters clean room space. Over 70% of its employees are engineers working on various research and development related projects. CXMT uses its 10G1 process technology (aka 19 nm) to make 4 GB and 8 GB DDR4 memory chips. It has licensed intellectual property originally created by Qimonda.

LPDDR4 RAM was added to the product portfolio in 2020.

See also
Semiconductor industry
Semiconductor industry in China
List of semiconductor fabrication plants

Notes

References

External links

Chinese brands
Manufacturing companies based in Hefei
Foundry semiconductor companies
Semiconductor companies of China